Manfred Kastl (born 23 September 1965) is a retired German football player.

Honours
Hamburg
 DFB-Pokal: 1986–87

VfB Stuttgart
 Bundesliga: 1991–92

References

External links
 

German footballers
Germany under-21 international footballers
Bundesliga players
SpVgg Greuther Fürth players
Hamburger SV players
Bayer 04 Leverkusen players
VfB Stuttgart players
SSV Ulm 1846 players
1965 births
Living people
Association football forwards